Studia Linguistica: A Journal of General Linguistics is a peer-reviewed academic journal of general linguistics established in 1947 and currently published by Wiley-Blackwell. Its current editors-in-chief are Christer Platzack (Lund University) and Arthur Holmer.

Linguistics journals
Wiley-Blackwell academic journals
Triannual journals
English-language journals